St. Boniface Church, Convent and Rectory is a historic site in Uniontown, Washington, United States.  It was built in 1905, consecrated in 1910, making it the first to be consecrated in the state of Washington, and added to the National Register of Historic Places in 1994.

References

Buildings and structures in Whitman County, Washington
Churches on the National Register of Historic Places in Washington (state)
Roman Catholic churches completed in 1905
Roman Catholic Diocese of Spokane
Roman Catholic churches in Washington (state)
Romanesque Revival church buildings in Washington (state)
National Register of Historic Places in Whitman County, Washington
Houses on the National Register of Historic Places in Washington (state)
1905 establishments in Washington (state)
20th-century Roman Catholic church buildings in the United States